Jennifer Belle (born 1968) is an American novelist, based in New York City.

She attended Bronx High School of Science and dropped out of college. She has also written columns for Ms. magazine. In 1996, she published her first book, Going Down, telling the story of a woman in her 20s, a topic that would appear also in her subsequent writings. In 2002, she married entertainment lawyer Andrew Krents, after they were introduced by fellow novelist Amy Sohn.

Her work has appeared in The New York Times Magazine, The New York Observer, London's The Independent, Cosmopolitan, Harper's Bazaar, Ms., Mudfish.

She teaches at the New York Writers' Workshop.

Works
 Going Down, Riverhead Books, 1996, 
 High Maintenance, Riverhead Books, 2001, 
 Animal Stackers, Illustrator David McPhail, Hyperion Books for Children, 2005, 
 Little Stalker, Penguin Group, 2008, 
 The Seven Year Bitch, Penguin Group USA, 2010,

References

External links
"Jennifer Belle", Beatrice Interviews
"A NIGHT OUT WITH: Jennifer Belle; On Familiar Turf", The New York Times, LINDA LEE, May 13, 2001

1968 births
Living people
American women novelists
20th-century American novelists
The Bronx High School of Science alumni
American columnists
American women columnists
21st-century American novelists
Writers from New York City
20th-century American women writers
21st-century American women writers
Novelists from New York (state)
American women non-fiction writers
20th-century American non-fiction writers
21st-century American non-fiction writers